Khojak Pass (el. ) is a mountain pass connecting Qila Abdullah with Chaman in the province of Baluchistan, Pakistan. The road through the Toba Achakzai range connects the larger cities of Quetta, Pakistan, and Kandahar, Afghanistan.

 Small forts defend the pass on each hill top.
"Historically, the Achakzai, across the Khojak Mountains, have controlled the smuggling routes around the Khojak Pass, one of the two major mountain passes that connect the Middle East with the Indian subcontinent, the other being the more famous" Khyber Pass.

References

Notes
 Encyclopedia of Pakistan by Zahid Hussain Anjum. Jahangir Book Depot, Pakistan (2005–06)

Mountain passes of Balochistan (Pakistan)
Mountain passes of Pakistan